Christian Liberty Academy (CLA) is a private Christian school serving about 500 students, located in Arlington Heights, Cook County, Illinois.  The school serves families who live in 69 surrounding cities.  CLA has grades preschool through twelfth grade and was founded in 1968 under the auspices of the Church of Christian Liberty.  The church provides oversight for the school as one of its ministries, though students and parents are not required to be members or attend the church.

Overview
CLA is accredited by the Association of Christian Schools International and the National Association of Private Schools. By choice, it is not a state accredited school, but despite this, it is a member of the Illinois High School Association.

History
Christian Liberty Academy was founded in 1968 in the basement of Prospect Heights, Illinois' Church of Christian Liberty. Its first year, about 60 children attended. According to the school's official website, the school was founded "as the result of the dissatisfaction of the church with government education and the desire for Christian education." The original headmaster was Paul Lindstrom.

At first, only classes for kindergarten through ninth grade were provided, however, within three years, the school also opened to high school-age students. The school quickly became too large for its location; in 1985, the school was moved to the former location of Arlington High School.

A satellite school was established in Wauwatosa, Wisconsin in 1970. The first headmaster was John H. Vouga. The school moved to larger quarters in Brookfield, Wisconsin in the fall of 1972. It ceased operations in 1989.

References

External links
 Official website

Christian schools in Illinois
Educational institutions established in 1968
Private middle schools in Illinois
Private elementary schools in Illinois
Private high schools in Cook County, Illinois
Private high schools in Illinois
Schools in Arlington Heights, Illinois